Cydney Gillon is an American IFBB professional figure and fitness competitor. She is the 2nd African-American woman to win the IFBB Figure Olympia competition and the first 6-time consecutive winner of the IFBB Figure Olympia competition (2017 to 2022).

Early life 
Gillon attended the University of Pennsylvania where she got a degree in psychology from the University of Pennsylvania School of Arts and Sciences. She also competed on the track team for University of Pennsylvania from 2010 to 2014.

Survivor 
She was a contestant on Survivor: Kaôh Rōng. She finished in 4th place after losing a tie-breaker fire making challenge to Aubry Bracco and lasted a total of 37 days in the game.

References

External links
Survivor Cast: Cydney Gillon - CBS

American female bodybuilders
Living people
People from Douglasville, Georgia
Sportspeople from the Atlanta metropolitan area
Survivor (American TV series) contestants
Year of birth missing (living people)
University of Pennsylvania School of Arts and Sciences alumni
21st-century American women